John Arthur Shepherd (born 20 September 1945) is an English former professional footballer who played as a midfielder or as an inside forward in the Football League for Rotherham United, York City and Oxford United, in non-League football for Scarborough and Hereford United.

References

1945 births
Living people
People from Maltby, South Yorkshire
English footballers
Association football midfielders
Association football forwards
Rotherham United F.C. players
York City F.C. players
Scarborough F.C. players
Oxford United F.C. players
Hereford United F.C. players
English Football League players